Yalchigulovo (Yalsığol) is a rural locality (a village) in Tungatarovsky Selsoviet, Uchalinsky District, Bashkortostan, Russia. The population was 75 as of 2010. There are 2 streets.

Geography 
Yalchigulovo is located 58 km northeast of Uchaly (the district's administrative centre) by road. Starobayramgulovo is the nearest rural locality.

References 

Rural localities in Uchalinsky District